USS Guadalcanal (LPH-7), the third Iwo Jima-class amphibious assault ship (helicopter), was launched by the Philadelphia Naval Shipyard 16 March 1963, sponsored by Zola Shoup, wife of General Shoup, the former Commandant of the Marine Corps; and commissioned 20 July 1963.  It was the second ship in the Navy to bear the name.

Operational history
Upon completion of sea trials and outfitting, Guadalcanal departed Philadelphia to join the Amphibious Forces, U.S. Atlantic Fleet. One of a new class of ships designed from the keel up to embark, transport, and land assault marines by means of helicopters, she lent new strength and flexibility to amphibious operations. After departing Norfolk 23 October 1963 for six weeks' shakedown training at Guantanamo Bay, Cuba, Guadalcanal steamed to Onslow Beach, North Carolina, 6 December for practice amphibious landings. She then carried on training and readiness operations with the Atlantic Fleet, based in Norfolk until departing for Panama 11 February 1964. Following 2 months on station as flagship for Commander PhibRon 12 with the 12 Marine Expeditionary Unit embarked and ready to land anywhere needed. Guadalcanal entered Philadelphia Naval Shipyard 26 May, but was deployed again 7 October as a unit of Operation "Steel Pike 1", a NATO landing exercise on the beaches of southern Spain.

Career highlights include 21 July 1966, when she recovered the Gemini X astronauts and their spacecraft after they landed in the Atlantic east of Cape Kennedy, and 13 March 1969, when she recovered the Apollo 9 capsule and crew off the Bahamas. In October 1985 the ship logged its 100,000th aircraft landing.

In 1987 Guadalcanal was leading minesweeping operations in the Persian Gulf when she encountered Iran Ajr laying mines in the shipping lanes. Helicopters from Guadalcanal attacked the ship; troops from Guadalcanal boarded and captured the ship. Guadalcanal also provided the Marines for the first wave of Operation Provide Comfort, the Kurdish relief operations in Northern Iraq immediately following the Persian Gulf War in 1991.

Guadalcanal was decommissioned in 1994, and stored as part of the James River Reserve Fleet until she was used as a target and sunk in the Virginia Capes area on 19 May 2005.

Other incidents

On 1 November 1966, a UH-2B Seasprite helicopter assigned to the ship crashed as it was taking off from the flight deck. Guadalcanal was in the Naval Shipyard in Portsmouth, VA to start a major overhaul at the time.  Three Navy men and one civilian shipyard worker were killed and 12 others were hospitalized.  Nine more sailors and civilians were treated for minor injuries.

On 9 May 1968 she floated adrift off North Carolina due to a burned out bearing in the propulsion system.

On 27 January 1976 she went aground in Augusta Bay, Sicily on a peak of coral which pushed in areas on either side of the bow, but did not crack or hole the ship.  Three days later, with cargo, personnel, helicopters, and fuel off-loaded to assist the effort, the ship was refloated.

On 17 September 1981 near Sardinia, Italy, a USMC CH-53D helicopter crashed while attempting to land aboard the ship during training exercises killing all five crewmen.

On 25 May 1993 Guadalcanal and the USS Monongahela (AO-178), collided during underway replenishment off of Cape Hatteras, North Carolina when Guadalcanal's main gyrocompass failed. Five crew suffered minor injuries and $1.635M in damage was caused to the two ships.

Awards

 Joint Meritorious Unit Award
 Navy Unit Commendation with 4 awards
 Navy Meritorious Unit Commendation with 4 awards
 Navy Battle "E" Ribbon with 4 awards
 Navy Expeditionary Medal with 4 awards (1-Iran/Indian Ocean, 2-Lebanon, 1-Libya)
 National Defense Service Medal 2 awards
 Armed Forces Expeditionary Medal with 6 awards (3-Dominican Republic, 1-Lebanon, 1-Persian Gulf, 1- Op. Restore Hope, Somalia)
 Southwest Asia Service Medal
 Humanitarian Service Medal
 Sea Service Deployment Ribbon - multiple

Gallery

References 

Iwo Jima-class amphibious assault ships
Cold War amphibious warfare vessels of the United States
Vietnam War amphibious warfare vessels of the United States
Apollo 9
Ships built in Philadelphia
1963 ships
Ships sunk as targets
Space capsule recovery ships